Tebenkova is a rural locality (a village) in Beloyevskoye Rural Settlement, Kudymkarsky District, Perm Krai, Russia. The population was 143 as of 2010. There are 5 streets.

Geography 
Tebenkova is located 41 km northwest of Kudymkar (the district's administrative centre) by road. Karp-Vaskina is the nearest rural locality.

References 

Rural localities in Kudymkarsky District